Walter Klingner (born 1961) is a German oboist and cor anglais player.

Life 
Born in Gotha, Klingner studied oboe with Axel Schmidt at the Hochschule für Musik Franz Liszt, Weimar. He now works there as a lecturer.

Since 1986, he is Solo Englisch hornist at the MDR Leipzig Radio Symphony Orchestra. He is also a guest performer at the Gewandhausorchester Leipzig, the Bachorchester Stuttgart, the Berliner Philharmonie and the Bayreuth Festival orchestra.

Numerous compositions have been premiered by him, among others by Gerd Domhardt. He recorded compositions by Felix Draeseke, Carlo Yvon and Elliott Carter with Frank Peter. Klingner is a member of the Kammersymphonie Leipzig and of the Ensemble Sortisatio.

Recordings 
 1991: Sächsisches Kammerorchester Leipzig
 1999: Thomas Müller: Kraino – Ich verwirkliche
 2003: Groupe Lacroix: 8 Pieces on Paul Klee (Creative  Works Records)
 2004: Ensemble Sortisatio (Querstand)
 2005: Ernst Krenek: Zeitlieder (Eos Record Label)
 2009: Jean-Luc Darbellay: A Portrait (Claves Records)
 2011: Thomas Buchholz: Ehre sei Gott für alles (Querstand)

References

External links 
 
 

Cor anglais players
German classical oboists
Academic staff of the Hochschule für Musik Franz Liszt, Weimar
1961 births
Living people
People from Thuringia